Tincture of cannabis, sometimes known as green dragon, is an alcoholic cannabis concentrate. The solubility of THC in ethanol is greater than 1 g/mL.

Cannabis tinctures are used in the production of specific extracts, like nabiximols.

History 

Cannabis tincture appeared in the United States Pharmacopoeia until 1942 (Australia 1977, UK 1970s). In the 20th century cannabis lost its appeal as a medicinal product, largely due to the development of apparently suitable alternatives, such as the hypodermic needle, water-soluble analgesics and synthetic hypnotics. A major concern of the regulatory authorities at that time was the widespread recreational use of cannabis.

The pharmacological target for cannabis, the endocannabinoid system, has been researched since its discovery in the 1980s.

Preparation 
The tincture is typically made by soaking the dried flowers of the female hemp plant (marijuana) in ethanol. The tetrahydrocannabinol (THC) and other cannabinoids dissolve into the alcohol. Some preparations also extract some of the water-based plant products such as chlorophyll, resulting in a dark green or brown liquid. Baking or drying the cannabis to decarboxylate prior to the alcohol bath increases the amount of THC in the resulting preparation.

Methods of use 
The tincture is ordinarily consumed orally, but may also be applied to the skin.

Gallery

See also 
 Hash oil

References 

Cannabis culture
Cannabis foods
Cannabis
Preparations of cannabis
Mixed drinks
Polysubstance alcoholic drinks